Sirka may refer to several places:

 Sirka, India, a town in Ramgarh district in the Indian state of Jharkhand.
 Sirka, Pakistan, a village in Tehsil Hazro, Attock District, Punjab, Pakistan.
 Sirka, Togo, a village in Binah Prefecture in the Kara Region of Togo.